McKay John Armstrong (17 September 1869 – 4 July 1913) was an Australian rules footballer who played for the Geelong Football Club in the Victorian Football League (VFL).

Notes

External links 

1869 births
1913 deaths
Australian rules footballers from Victoria (Australia)
Geelong Football Club players
People educated at Geelong College